There are two kinds of seismic body waves in solids, pressure waves (P-waves) and shear waves. In linear elasticity, the P-wave modulus , also known as the longitudinal modulus, or the constrained modulus, is one of the elastic moduli available to describe isotropic homogeneous materials. 

It is defined as the ratio of axial stress to axial strain in a uniaxial strain state. This occurs when expansion in the transverse direction is prevented by the inertia of neighboring material, such as in an earthquake, or underwater seismic blast. 

where all the other strains  are zero.

This is equivalent to stating that

where VP is the velocity of a P-wave and ρ is the density of the material through which the wave is propagating.

References
 G. Mavko, T. Mukerji, J. Dvorkin. The Rock Physics Handbook. Cambridge University Press 2003 (paperback). 

Materials science
Elasticity (physics)